Dyssomnias are a broad classification of sleeping disorders involving difficulty getting to sleep, remaining asleep, or of excessive sleepiness.

Dyssomnias are primary disorders of initiating or maintaining sleep or of excessive sleepiness and are characterized by a disturbance in the amount, quality, or timing of sleep.

Patients may complain of difficulty getting to sleep or staying asleep, intermittent wakefulness during the night, early morning awakening, or combinations of any of these. Transient episodes are usually of little significance. Stress, caffeine, physical discomfort, daytime napping, and early bedtimes are common factors.

Types
There are over 31 recognized kinds of dyssomnias. The major three groups, along with the group types, include:

 Intrinsic sleep disorders
 idiopathic hypersomnia,
 narcolepsy,
 periodic limb movement disorder,
 restless legs syndrome,
 obstructive sleep apnea,
 central sleep apnea syndrome,
 sleep state misperception,
 psychophysiologic insomnia,
 recurrent hypersomnia,
 post-traumatic hypersomnia,
 central alveolar hypoventilation syndrome,
 Extrinsic sleep disorders – 13 disorders recognized, including
 alcohol-dependent sleep disorder,
 food allergy insomnia,
 inadequate sleep routine.
 Circadian rhythm sleep disorders, both intrinsic and extrinsic – 6 disorders recognized, including
 advanced sleep phase syndrome,
 delayed sleep phase syndrome,
 jetlag,
 shift work sleep disorder.

See also
 Parasomnia
 Sleep problems in women
 Somnolence

References

External links 

Sleep disorders